Ant-keeping (or ant keeping) is a hobby involving the capture, care, and observation of ants and ant colonies. It is a form of lay myrmecology.

History

Keeping ants as pets has been a common hobby since the mass-marketed Uncle Milton's Ant Farm achieved commercial success in the late 1950s, though these ant farms did not include a queen ant for legal reasons. With exception of Pogonomyrmex occidentalis, U.S. Federal law prohibits shipping live queen ants of other species (and other “plant pests”) in interstate commerce.

Reasons for ant-keeping

Ant keepers may choose to keep ants in captivity for the purpose of documenting ant behavior (in the case of an ant species which is difficult to observe in the wild). This field of study is called myrmecology. Ant keepers may also choose to keep ants as a casual hobby; i.e., as pets. People who keep ants may also keep them for scientific purposes and experiments.

Starting a colony

There are differing methods of starting, caring for, and housing an ant colony. In the United States queen ants can be bought from vendors provided that the seller is from your state and that the species purchased is also native to your state. If you are in the UK or in any other European country, most exotic species of ant can be purchased legally through vendors though it depends on local laws.

Locating a queen ant

The first step involved in ant keeping is capturing a fertilized queen ant. Ants engage in nuptial flights during spring, summer, and some species have also been recorded to have their nuptial flights during winter. After these flights a fertilized queen ant will land and remove her wings before locating a spot to found her new colony. Nuptial flights often happens after a heavy rain or a drastic seasonal change. If a queen has already chewed her wings off, she is likely (but not certainly) fertilized. If a queen ant on the ground still has her wings, she is likely unfertilized.

A queen ant can be distinguished from an ergate (worker ant) by the relatively larger size of the thorax (which at this point contains the wing muscles of the queen), and the enlarged abdomen which contains eggs. Beware that certain species have large workers similar in size to a queen; Pheidologeton diversus, for example, possesses several castes of dinergates (soldier ants). If the possible queen you are looking at has marks on either side of the thorax (wing scars, where the wings of the queen were) it is a queen. If not, it's a supermajor; a larger worker of the colony.

Housing the queen ant

For fully claustral species, the queen should be sealed in a dark, aerated small container with access to water. One way to provide this environment involves using a test tube, some water, and two cotton balls. One cotton ball is pressed against the water, the queen is inserted, and the other cotton ball is used to plug the end of the tube. This nesting chamber should be kept in the dark for one month while the queen lays her eggs and tends to them until they hatch. A claustral ant species need not be fed during this period, as a queen ant will digest her now-useless wing muscles to provide her with the necessary energy until her first generation of workers emerges. But feeding a small drop of honey energises the queen ant and reduces the chances of her eating her own eggs.

For a semi-claustral species, which will require food during this nesting phase, protein rich foods should be provided intermittently during the pre-worker phase, with the frequency and type of food determined by the specific species of ant.

Moving the ants into a larger housing

If successful with feeding the first generation of workers, the queen ant should continue laying eggs. Eventually (at about 25 worker ants), the colony should be moved into a larger housing such as a formicarium to allow continued growth of the colony. If you wish to put your ants into a setup before this 'worker limit', you may purchase a 'test tube outworld' which will allow them to be fed more easily, while still inside the test tube.

Caring for ants

Dietary needs 

An ant's diet should consist primarily of sugars/carbohydrates (such as fruit, sugar water, raw honey, or honeydew) and proteins (such as mealworms, cockroaches, or bits of egg). The sugars are necessary to provide the ants with energy, and the proteins are necessary for the growth of the colony. Uneaten food should be removed to prevent the growth of mold in the formicarium.

Environmental needs 

Besides the obvious need of a formicarium and outworld (A separate container, often decorated to resemble the outside world, in which the ants forage for food.), ants require certain conditions to thrive. For one, almost all ants, save for a few twig nesting species, will not survive without a source of humidity in their nest. This can be accomplished in many ways; some nests are made of a naturally absorbent material, such as plaster, some contain a sponge or cotton ball which is watered when need be, and others still contain a reservoir of water which evaporates over time. Most ants also appreciate a heat source; as ants are cold blooded, their colonies develop faster the warmer their nest is. A heating cable is the preferred method of many antkeepers, but heat lamps, heating pads, and un-air conditioned rooms are all worthy alternatives. Many antkeepers keep their ants in a dark area to avoid stressing them (Ants usually live underground and flee from light in their nest, which would indicate a breach.), though most species become desensitized to light after being exposed to it frequently. While light-aversion can be a useful tool when moving colonies to new habitats, the benefits of having ants both indifferent to observation and more easily monitored far outweighs this, especially when more effective alternatives, such as physical disturbance to or partial disassembly of the formicarium exist.

Laws on keeping ants 

The legality of intentionally shipping reproductive ants (usually a mated queen or whole colony) across state, provincial, or international borders varies substantially by country. In the United States, it is illegal to ship live queen ants across state lines without a license or explicit permission from relevant state or federal entities. As of 2019, however, at least one species (Pogonomyrmex occidentalis) is legal to ship within the United States, with the exception of Alaska, California, Florida, and Hawaii. In Europe, some domestic species (such as Formica rufa) are protected, and it is illegal to own, keep, buy, or sell these ants, or to damage their nests. However, unlike for reptiles and spiders, there are no rules for owning, keeping, buying or selling non-protected species inside the EU and many other countries.

In popular culture

Over the years ant-keeping has become more normalised through the internet. Ants Canada and Ants Australia are both some of the key influencers in ant-keeping culture. They have together helped society think of ant keeping as a normal hobby and not one to be afraid of.

See also 

Beekeeping
Formicarium
Nuptial flight
Queen ant

References

Ants
Pet keeping